The John Valentine House, now replaced by the Sigma Phi Epsilon Fraternity House, was a Prairie School style building in Muncie, Indiana.  It was designed by Barry Byrne and was built in 1918. The Sigma Phi Epsilon fraternity house at Ball State University, 1101 Riverside Avenue in Muncie, occupies the site of the John Valentine House. The house was designed by Barry Byrne and was listed on the National Register of Historic Places in 1983.

It appears to have been destroyed and was removed from the National Register on March 22, 2014.

References

Former National Register of Historic Places in Indiana
Houses on the National Register of Historic Places in Indiana
Prairie School architecture in Indiana
Houses completed in 1918
Houses in Muncie, Indiana
National Register of Historic Places in Muncie, Indiana